Martiros is an Armenian given name meaning martyr.

Martiros and its variant Mardiros in Western Armenian may refer to:

Places
Martiros, Vayots Dzor

Persons

Martiros
Saint Martiros, Christian saint, son of Saint Sarkis the Warrior
Martiros Kavoukjian (1908-1988), Armenian architect, researcher, Armenologist and historian-archaeologist
Martiros Manoukian (born 1947), Armenian artist
Martiros Sarukhanyan (1873-1895), Armenian fedayee, political activist
Martiros Saryan (1880–1972), Armenian painter

Mardiros
Mardiros of Egypt, Armenian Patriarch of Jerusalem from 1419 to 1430 (See list)
Mardiros I of Constantinople, Armenian Patriarch of Constantinople from 1509 to 1526 (See list)
Mardiros II of Constantinople (Kefetsi), Armenian Patriarch of Constantinople from 1659 to 1660 (See list)
Mardiros III of Constantinople (Yerzngatsi) Armenian Patriarch of Constantinople in 1706 (See list)

See also
Martirosyan (includes Mardirosian / Mardirossian)
Armenian masculine given names